Marquess of Normanby is a title that has been created twice, once in the Peerage of England and once in the Peerage of the United Kingdom. The first creation came in 1694 in the Peerage of England in favour of John Sheffield, 3rd Earl of Mulgrave. He was a notable Tory politician of the late Stuart period, who served under Queen Anne as Lord Privy Seal and Lord President of the Council. In 1703 this first Marquess of Normanby was further honoured when he was made Duke of Buckingham and Normanby. These titles became extinct on the death of the 2nd Duke in 1735.

The second creation came in the Peerage of the United Kingdom on 25 June 1838, in favour of Constantine Phipps, 2nd Earl of Mulgrave. He was a noted politician and served as Lord Lieutenant of Ireland and as Home Secretary. His great-grandfather William Phipps had married Lady Catherine Annesley, who was the daughter and heiress of James Annesley, 3rd Earl of Anglesey and his wife Lady Catherine Darnley (an illegitimate daughter of King James II by his mistress Catherine Sedley, Countess of Dorchester). Lady Catherine Darnley had later married John Sheffield, 1st Duke of Buckingham and Normanby, and hence Constantine Phipps, 2nd Earl of Mulgrave was the step-great-great-grandson of the 1st Duke of Buckingham and Normanby. Upon his death, Constantine Phipps, 1st Marquess of Normanby was succeeded by his son, the 2nd Marquess. He was a Liberal politician and also served as Governor of New Zealand. His grandson, the fourth Marquess, served briefly as a Labour Lord-in-waiting (government whip in the House of Lords) in 1945 and was also Lord Lieutenant of the North Riding of Yorkshire and of North Yorkshire. As of 2013 the titles are held by the latter's eldest son, the fifth Marquess, who succeeded in 1994. The fifth Marquess also served in the House of Lords until he lost his seat in the House of Lords Act 1999.

The family seat is Mulgrave Castle near Whitby, North Yorkshire.

Marquess of Normanby, First creation (1694)
see the Duke of Buckingham and Normanby

Barons Mulgrave, First Creation (1767)
Constantine Phipps, 1st Baron Mulgrave (1722–1775)
Constantine John Phipps, 2nd Baron Mulgrave, 1st Baron Mulgrave (1744–1792) (created Baron Mulgrave in 1790; title extinct on his death)
Henry Phipps, 3rd Baron Mulgrave, 1st Baron Mulgrave (1755–1831) (created Baron Mulgrave in 1794 and Viscount Normanby and Earl of Mulgrave in 1812)

Earls of Mulgrave, Second Creation (1812)
Henry Phipps, 1st Earl of Mulgrave, 1st Viscount Normanby, 3rd Baron Mulgrave,  1st Baron Mulgrave (1755–1831)
Constantine Henry Phipps, 2nd Earl of Mulgrave, 2nd Viscount Normanby, 4th Baron Mulgrave, 2nd Baron Mulgrave  (1797–1863) (created Marquess of Normanby in 1838)

Marquesses of Normanby, Second Creation (1838)
Constantine Henry Phipps, 1st Marquess of Normanby, 2nd Earl of Mulgrave, 2nd Viscount Normanby, 4th Baron Mulgrave, 2nd Baron Mulgrave (1797–1863)
George Augustus Constantine Phipps, 2nd Marquess of Normanby, 3rd Earl of Mulgrave, 3rd Viscount Normanby, 5th Baron Mulgrave, 3rd Baron Mulgrave (1819–1890)
Constantine Charles Henry Phipps, 3rd Marquess of Normanby, 4th Earl of Mulgrave, 4th Viscount Normanby, 6th Baron Mulgrave, 4th Baron Mulgrave  (1846–1932)
Oswald Constantine John Phipps, 4th Marquess of Normanby, 5th Earl of Mulgrave, 5th Viscount Normanby, 7th Baron Mulgrave, 5th Baron Mulgrave (1912–1994)
Constantine Edmund Walter Phipps, 5th Marquess of Normanby, 6th Earl of Mulgrave, 6th Viscount Normanby, 8th Baron Mulgrave, 6th Baron Mulgrave  (b. 1954)

The heir apparent is the present holder's son John Samuel Constantine Phipps, Earl of Mulgrave (b. 1994).

Line of succession

 Henry Phipps, 1st Earl of Mulgrave (1755–1831)
  Constantine Phipps, 1st Marquess of Normanby (1797-1863)
 George Phipps, 2nd Marquess of Normanby (1819–1890)
 Constantine Phipps, 3rd Marquess of Normanby (1846-1932)
  Oswald Phipps, 4th Marquess of Normanby (1912–1994)
  Constantine Phipps, 5th Marquess of Normanby (born 1954)
 (1). John Samuel Constantine Phipps, Earl of Mulgrave (b. 1994)
 (2). Lord Thomas Henry Winston Phipps (b. 1997)
 (3). Lord Justin Charles Phipps (b. 1958)
 (4). William David Phipps (b. 1990)
 Lord Henry George Russell Phipps (1851-1905)
 Vivian Louis Augustus Phipps (1884-1971)
 Vivian Henry Blakeney Phipps (1923-1991)
male issue in succession
 Hervey Owen Phipps (1925-1982)
male issue in succession
Hon. Sir Charles Beaumont Phipps (1801–1866)
Charles Edmund Phipps (1844–1906)
Albert Edmund Phipps (1873–1945)
Norman Ernest Phipps (1907–1984)
male issue in remainder to earldom
 Augustus Henry Constantine Phipps (1882–1946)
male issue in remainder to earldom
Hon. Edmund Phipps (1808–1857)
Sir Constantine Phipps (1840–1911)
Sir Eric Phipps (1875–1945)
Alan Phipps (1915–1942)
Jeremy Julian Joseph Phipps (1942–2021)
male issue in remainder to earldom
John Francis Phipps (b. 1933)
male issue in remainder to earldom
William Phipps (1936–2009)
male issue in remainder to earldom

See also
Baron Sheffield
Earl of Mulgrave
Duke of Buckingham and Normanby

References

Sources

 

Marquessates in the Peerage of the United Kingdom
1694 establishments in England
Noble titles created in 1694
Noble titles created in 1838
Noble titles created for UK MPs
Normanby
Extinct marquessates in the Peerage of England